Aşağı Qaraməryam (also, Ashagy Karamar’yam and Karamar’yam) is a village and municipality in the Goychay Rayon of Azerbaijan.  It has a population of 838.

References 

Populated places in Goychay District